Punkreas is one of the most famous punk bands in Italy. They were founded in Parabiago, Milan, in 1989.

In more than twenty years of activity (with many concerts) Punkreas had only one lineup change, while recording an album every two years. The current band members are Cippa (voice), Flaco (electric guitar), Paletta (electric bass), Noyse (electric guitar), who substituted Claudio since the demo tape Isterico and Gagno (drums), who substituted Mastino since the record Falso.

Recently, ska has been increasingly integrated into the band's music, creating a more complex sound.

History
In December 1990, Punkreas released the demo Isterico, their self-made debut record, containing the single "Il vicino", that quickly became a success and the flagship song of Italian ska core. Many live shows followed Isterico and in 1992 United Rumors of Punkreas was published, excellent forebear of Paranoia e Potere, maybe the band's best record.

Paranoia e Potere gave Punkreas celebrity, putting them among the most well-known Italian punk bands. The analog recording, easily noticeable listening to their songs, made their music more aggressive and homogeneous; songs well recognized even today, such as "Acà Toro," "La Canzone del Bosco" and "Tutti in Pista" are part of this record.

1997 was a busy year for Punkreas: the growing interest towards the band, due to the huge number of lives, lead to the new publication of Isterico and United Rumors of Punkreas under the best of 90–93, while the publication of the new album Elettrodomestico was taken up. That last record was produced under the newborn Atomo Dischi, the new Punkreas record company.
The exhibitions at the Festival Teste Vuote Ossa Rotte – which later would become Independent Day – and Vans Warped Tour confirmed the newly acquired success (as well as the status) gained by the band.

In 2000 the group published Pelle, distributed by Universal. The record reached the main distribution channels, due to the distribution by a Major Label. Three videos were also produced for the album, Sosta, Terzo mondo and Voglio Armarmi: the first is about a singular and unlucky theft in a store, the second with cultivated references, like Dr. Strangelove, the third entirely made of the cartoons by Davide Toffolo.

in 2002 the lineup underwent some changes: Gagno took the role of Mastino. That was the year of Falso, an album with greater influences of ska, reggae and rock. This album firstly met the resistance of those fearing that the distribution by a major label could cool the tones of the band. The video Canapa was shot for this publication. In the video the group members are shown seeding a plant of marijuana and making it grow. This record comprises also the songs Falsa and Toda la noche.

In 2005 Quello che sei was published under the Atomo Dischi brand, with songs like "American Dream," "L'uomo con le branchie" and "Chirurgo Plastico." This record was also meant to contain the song "Ma che bel mondo è," a cover of the song What a Wonderful World by Louis Armstrong, but ownership issues inhibited the publication of the song, that is available for download on the web.

In January 2012 they published Noblesse Oblige, and in June 2014 their last album Radio Punkreas.

Discography

Studio
Isterico 1990
United Rumors of Punkreas 1992
Paranoia e potere 1995
Elettrodomestico 1997
Pelle 2000
Falso 2002
Quello che sei 2005
Futuro Imperfetto 2008
Noblesse Oblige 2012
Radio Punkreas 2014
Il lato ruvido 2016

Lives and Best of
Punkreas 90–93 1997
Punkreas Live 2006
XXV Paranoia Domestica 2015

Singles
La canzone del bosco 1997
Sosta 2000
Voglio Armarmi 2002
Terzo Mondo 2000
Canapa 2002
Dividi e comanda 2003
Toda la noche 2002
American Dream 2005
L'uomo con le branchie 2005
La canzone del bosco (live) 2006
Tyson Rock 2008
Cuore nero 2008
Polenta e Kebab 2012
Ali di pietra 2012

Videos
Sosta ;
Terzo Mondo ;
Voglio Armarmi ;
Dividi e Comanda ;
Canapa ;
American Dream ;
L'uomo con le branchie ;
Mondo Proibito .

References

External links
Official website
Official forum

Italian musical groups
Italian punk rock groups
Musical groups from Milan